Hills Church (formerly Rolling Hills Christian Church) is a non-denominational, Evangelical Christian  located in El Dorado Hills, CA.

History
It was founded on Easter, 1995 by Jeff Bigelow.  In 2015, the church had 2,000 members. In 2019, Jonathan Hansen became the Senior pastor.

Student Ministry 
Hills Church boasts one of the largest Student Ministries in Northern California. Students from middle schools and high school from around the area meet weekly to discuss, bond, and reflect on their beliefs and thoughts about religion and the world.

The student ministries participate in their most popular community contribution in the spring when the high school group is given the opportunity to travel to Mexico and construct and build homes for less fortunate families.

References

External links
 Hills Church - El Dorado Hills, CA, USA

Evangelical megachurches in the United States
Megachurches in California
Evangelical churches in California
Churches in El Dorado County, California
Christian organizations established in 1995